The Centre for Theoretical Cosmology is a research centre within the Department of Applied Mathematics and Theoretical Physics  at the University of Cambridge. Founded by Stephen Hawking in 2007, it encourages new thinking on some of the most challenging problems in science, with an aim to advance the scientific understanding of the universe.

References

External links 
Centre for Theoretical Cosmology, University of Cambridge

Theoretical Cosmology, Centre for